Theta lyronuclea is a species of sea snail, a marine gastropod mollusk in the family Raphitomidae.

Description
The length of the shell attains 9.3 mm.

Distribution
This marine species occurs in the Atlantic Ocean off Madeira.

References

 Clarke, A.H., Jr. (1959) New abyssal molluscs from off Bermuda collected by the Lamont Geological Observatory. Proceedings of the Malacological Society of London, 33, 231–238, pl. 13
 Gofas, S.; Le Renard, J.; Bouchet, P. (2001). Mollusca. in: Costello, M.J. et al. (eds), European Register of Marine Species: a check-list of the marine species in Europe and a bibliography of guides to their identification. Patrimoines Naturels. 50: 180–213.

External links
 
 Gastropods.com: Gymnobela (Theta) lyronuclea

lyronuclea
Gastropods described in 1959